This article is about the beliefs and theology of the Nation of Islam.

Main beliefs
The main belief of The Nation of Islam and its followers is that there is only one god, whom they claim "came in the person" of Wallace Fard Muhammad, and that Elijah Muhammad is a messenger of God. The official beliefs as stated by the Nation of Islam have been outlined in books, documents, and articles published by the organization as well as speeches by Elijah Muhammad, Malcolm X, Louis Farrakhan, and other ministers. Many of Elijah Muhammad's teachings may be found in Message to the Blackman in America and The True History of Jesus as Taught by the Honorable Elijah Muhammad (Chicago: Coalition for the Remembrance of Elijah, 1992).

Many of Malcolm X's teachings of NOI theology are in his The End of White World Supremacy, while a later more critical discussion of those beliefs can be found in The Autobiography of Malcolm X, co-written with Alex Haley.

It is important to note that near the end of Malcolm X's life, Malcolm, along with Elijah Muhammad's son, Wallace Muhammad, left the Nation of Islam. Malcolm, following Wallace's footsteps, along with many other followers entered Sunni Islam. They rejected that Wallace Fard Muhammad was God in person, and that Elijah Muhammad is a messenger sent by God. The Prophet Muhammad from 570 CE to 632 CE is the last prophet for humankind, according to Islam - Qur'an Verse 40, Surah Al-Ahzab (chapter 33).

Passed down via written lessons from 1930 to 1934 from W. Fard Muhammad to his student Elijah Muhammad, referred to and titled The Supreme Wisdom, the Nation of Islam continues to teach its followers that the present world society is segmented into three distinct categories. It teaches that from a general perspective, 85% of the world's people of all races and faiths are the deaf, dumb and blind masses of the people who "are easily led in the wrong direction and hard to lead in the right direction". This 85% of the masses are said to be manipulated by 10% of the people who are referred to as the rich slave-makers of the masses of the people. Those 10% rich slave-makers are said to manipulate the 85% masses of the people through ignorance, the skillful use of religious doctrine, and the mass media.

The third group referred to as the 5% is the poor righteous teachers of the people of the world who know the truth of the manipulation of the 85% masses of the people by the 10% and that 5%, the righteous teachers, are at constant struggle and war with 10% to reach and free the minds of the masses of the people. (Assignment of Mr. Elijah Muhammad, The Supreme Wisdom, February 20, 1934; Power at Last Forever, Minister Louis Farrakhan, Madison Square Garden, New York, October 1985)

Black experience of slavery was Bible prophecy
The NOI teaches that Black people constitute a nation and that through the institution of the Atlantic slave trade they were systematically denied knowledge of their history, language, culture, and religion and, in effect, lost control of their lives. Central to this doctrine, NOI theology asserts that Black people's experience of slavery was the fulfillment of Bible prophecy, and therefore, black people are the seed of Abraham referred to in the Bible, in Genesis 15:13–14:

 Know of a surety that thy seed shall be a stranger in a land that is not theirs, and shall serve them; and they shall afflict them four hundred years; and also that nation, whom they shall serve, will I judge and afterward shall they come out with great substance.

And Acts 7:6:
 And God spoke on this wise, that his seed should sojourn in a strange land; and that they should bring them into bondage, and entreat them evil four hundred years. And the nation to whom they shall be in bondage will I judge, said God: and after that shall they come forth, and serve me in this place.

Both of these passages refer to the period of enslavement of the Israelites in Egypt as recorded in The Bible, the book of Exodus. Not to be confused with the period of Babylonian captivity in the 5th century B.C. which lasted only seventy years.

Teachings on race
The Nation of Islam teaches that black people are the aboriginal people and that all other people come from them. Louis Farrakhan has stated "If you look at the human family—now, I'm talking about black, brown, red, yellow and white—we all seem to be frozen on a subhuman level of existence. In Islam and, I believe, in development. But when moral consciousness comes and we have a self-accusing spirit, it is then that we become human beings. Right now, we have the potential for humanity, but we have not reached that potential because we are functioning on the animalistic plane of existence."

In an interview on NBC's Meet the Press, Louis Farrakhan said the following in response to host Tim Russert's question on the Nation of Islam's teachings on race:

You know, it's not unreal to believe that white people—who genetically cannot produce yellow, brown or black—had a Black origin. The scholars and scientists of this world agree that the origin of man and humankind started in Africa and that the first parent of the world was Black. The Qur'an says that God created Adam out of black mud and fashioned him into shape. So if white people came from the original people, the Black people, what is the process by which you came to life? That is not a silly question. That is a scientific question with a scientific answer. It doesn't suggest that we are superior or that you are inferior. It suggests, however, that your birth or your origin is from the black people of this earth: superiority and inferiority are determined by our righteousness and not by our color.

Pressed by Russert on whether he agreed with Elijah Muhammad's preaching that whites are "blue-eyed devils", Farrakhan responded:

Well, you have not been saints in the way you have acted toward the darker peoples of the world and toward even your own people. But, in truth, Mr. Russert, any human being who gives themself over to the doing of evil could be considered a devil. In the Bible, in the Book of Revelation, it talks about the fall of Babylon. It says Babylon is fallen because she has become the habitation of devils. We believe that that ancient Babylon is a symbol of a modern Babylon, which is America.

 
Malcolm X said:

The Mother Plane
Elijah Muhammad taught his followers that the vision of the prophet Ezekiel, which Jews call the Merkabah, was a UFO that he called the Mother Wheel or Mother Plane:

Louis Farrakhan, commenting on his teacher's description, said the following:

Under the leadership of Louis Farrakhan since 1981, the current  members of the Nation of Islam hold that Elijah Muhammad did not die, but was restored to health, and is aboard "that huge wheel-like plane that is even now flying over our heads."

Allah

The nation believes that Allah came to North America in the person of Wallace Fard Muhammad to teach the Black people about their true history. This is considered blasphemous by other Islamic denominations because of the NOI's belief of God appearing in human form.

Criticisms
The NOI has been seen by some as attempting to be its own religion separate of Islam. The first book analyzing the Nation of Islam was The Black Muslims in America (1961) by C. Eric Lincoln. Lincoln describes how religious services use myths and over-generalizations to indoctrinate NOI adherents.

References

External links
 Nation of Islam website

Nation of Islam